Norman Hamilton, OBE (born 6 October 1946) was Moderator of the Presbyterian Church in Ireland from June 2010 - June 2011. He has also been minister of the Ballysillan Presbyterian Church in Belfast for twenty-four years.

He succeeded Stafford Carson in June 2010, after an election of the nineteen Irish Presbyteries in March of the same year.

References

1946 births
Living people
Presbyterian ministers from Northern Ireland
People from Lurgan
Moderators of the Presbyterian Church in Ireland